Anle is a town in Yanggu County, Liaocheng, in western Shandong province, China. , it has 45 villages under its administration.

References

Township-level divisions of Shandong
Yanggu County, Shandong